Consumed is a live album by GOD, released on 19 October 1993 through Sentrax.

Track listing

Personnel 
GOD
Lou Ciccotelli – drums, percussion
Dave Cochrane – bass guitar
John Edwards – double bass
Tim Hodgkinson – alto saxophone
Scott Kiehl – drums, percussion
Gary Jeff – bass guitar
Kevin Martin – tenor saxophone, vocals
Simon Picard – tenor saxophone
Niko Wenner – guitar
Production and additional personnel
Denis Blackham – mastering
Dietmar Diesner – soprano saxophone
Peter Morris – photography

References 

1993 live albums
God (British band) albums